Póker de amantes para tres is a 1969 Argentine film.

Cast
 Oscar Brizuela		
 Elvira Porcel		
 Irene Moreno		
 Juan Alighieri

External links
 

1969 films
Argentine romantic comedy-drama films
1960s Spanish-language films
1960s Argentine films